Mor lam (Lao: ໝໍລຳ; Thai/Isan: หมอลำ) is a traditional Lao form of song in Laos and Isan. Mor lam means 'expert song', or 'expert singer', referring to the music or artist respectively.  Other romanisations used include mor lum, maw lam, maw lum, moh lam, mhor lum, and molum.  In Laos, the music is known simply as lam (ລຳ); mor lam (ໝໍລຳ) refers to the singer.

The characteristic feature of lam singing is the use of a flexible melody tailored to the tones of the words in the text. Traditionally, the tune was developed by the singer as an interpretation of a klon poem and accompanied primarily by the khene (a free reed mouth organ). The modern form is frequently composed and uses electrified instruments. Traditional forms (and some Lao genres) use a slower tempo than the quicker tempo and faster deliveries of more modern lam music. Strong rhythmic accompaniments, vocal leaps, and a conversational style of singing distinguish lam from American rap.

Typically featuring a theme of unrequited love, mor lam often reflects the difficulties of life in rural Isan and Laos, leavened with wry humor. In its heartland, performances are an essential part of festivals and ceremonies. Lam has gained a profile outside its native regions from the spread of migrant workers, for whom it remains an important cultural link with home.

Appellation
In Laos, the traditional folk music is referred to as ລຳ, lam , which refers to both the verb and noun 'dance', and is in general use in the central and southern areas of the country. In northern Laos, the regional folk music styles are referred to as ຂັບ, khap , and signifies 'to sing' or a 'song'.  The Lao-speaking people across the river in Isan call the music หมอลำ, mo lam, which refers to both the singer and the musical style, while in Laos, the equivalent term ໝໍລຳ, molam , only refers to the singer. Lao ໝໍ and Isan หมอ, both mo , (as well as Thai หมอ, mo ) refers specifically to an 'expert', 'shaman', or 'doctor'.  The northern Lao terms ขับ, khap  and mokhap , are not used in Isan, but are likely still used in some Lao-speaking parts of Loei, Uttaradit, and Phitsanulok that were settled by people originally from northern Laos, however, khap is understood as a rarer word for 'to sing' or 'song' and in reference to specifically northern styles of lam.  Northern Lao areas refer to the khène/khaen player as the mokhène/mokhaen just as in the rest of Laos and Isan.

In standard Thai, the music and the singer, as adopted from Isan usage, is also known as หมอลำ, molam, but because of the tone differences is generally pronounced .  It is also common to "correct" or "translate" the Isan term into standard Thai as หมอรำ, mo ram , as Thai รำ, ram , is cognate to Lao ລຳ and Isan ลำ and shares the same meaning. Although Thai ขับ khap  is cognate to Lao ຂັບ and Isan ขับ, it only refers to the verb 'to sing' in Thai and is a rather archaic, poetic word and would generally be confused with the homonym ขับ which means 'to drive' (a vehicle), 'to drive away' or 'to expel'. Thus, the northern Lao forms are almost unknown in standard Thai media references to Lao and Isan folk music.

Instrumentation
As the lowland areas of Laos and Isan are essentially one shared cultural region of Lao people, few differences, especially at its most traditional level, are present to distinguish traditional forms on either side.  Throughout the Lao-speaking heartlands, the only accompaniment to performances of khap and lam was the local free reed mouth-organ, the khène (BGN/PCGN)/khaen (RTGS).  Similar in many ways to the function of the bagpipe in the Scottish Highlands, the khène/khaen provides not only the melody but can also be used to provide a drone as it is played with circular breathing.  So important is the khène/khaen in Lao music, the instrument even came to be used in the Lao classical music ensemble known as sép noy (BGN/PCGN)/sep noi (RTGS), where most of the instruments are influenced by the veneer of Indian musical traditions as well as classical musical traditions of neighboring Thailand, Cambodia, and Java.  

In lam styles of central and southern Laos and most of Isan, traditional performances often included ensembles. Most northern khap styles relied solely on the khène/khaen, except for a few styles, such as those from Luang Phrabang, many of which were adaptations of the local classical music traditions as the city was the seat of the Lao monarchy until its forced abdication in 1975. The southern lam styles, heavily influenced by the ancient musical traditions of the Mon-Khmer peoples, such as the Mon, Khmer, Kuy and Bru that either were the former inhabitants or continue to live amongst the Tai peoples that now make up the majority in the Lao-speaking region.

Most modern styles, including the northern khap varieties, are generally heard with ensembles consisting of a mixture of Western instruments and traditional ones. Contemporary ensembles often feature electric guitars, drum sets, bass guitars, accordions, saxophones, violins, and keyboards set to sound like the 1960s Farsifa organs or set to provide equivalents of native instruments.

History
Morlam had its birth in the Lao heartlands of Laos, where it remains a popular art form. Although its precursors probably lie in the musical traditions of the historical Tai tribes that migrated south from China and northern Vietnam, much cross-pollination with indigenous music of the region as well as importation of Chinese, Mon-Khmer, Indian, and Malay influences, has also had a pronounced effect on the dances, instrumentation, and melodies of mor lam.

In the late 18th and 19th centuries, the music of Laos began to spread into the Thai heartland, extending Lao influence to Siam. Forced population transfers from Laos into the newly acquired region of Isan and what is now Central Thailand accelerated the rapid adoption of mor lam. Even King Mongkut's vice-king Pinklao became enamoured of it. But in 1857, following the vice-king's death, Mongkut banned public performances, citing the threat it posed to Thai culture and its alleged role in causing a drought. Performance of mor lam thereafter was a largely local affair, confined to events such as festivals in Isan and Laos. However, as Isan people began to migrate throughout the rest of the country, the music came with them. The first major mor lam performance of the 20th century in Bangkok took place at the Rajadamnern Stadium in 1946.  Even then, the number of migrant workers from Isan was fairly small, and mor lam was paid little attention by the outside world.

In the 1950s and 1960s, there were attempts in both Thailand and Laos to appropriate lam for political purposes. The USIS in Thailand and both sides in the Laotian Civil War (the "Secret War") recruited mor lam singers to insert propaganda into their performances, in hopes persuading the rural population to support their cause. The Thai attempt was unsuccessful, taking insufficient account of performers' practices and the audiences' demands, but it was more successful in Laos. The victorious Communists continued to maintain a propaganda troupe even after seizing power in 1975.

Mor lam started to spread in Thailand in the late-1970s and early-1980s, when more and more people left rural Isan to seek work. Mor lam performers began to appear on television, led by Banyen Rakgaen, and the music soon gained a national profile. It remains an important link to home for Isan migrants in the capital city, where mor lam clubs and karaoke bars are meeting places for those newly arrived.

Contemporary mor lam is very different from that of previous generations. None of the traditional Isan genres is commonly performed today; instead singers perform three-minute songs combining lam segments with luk thung or pop style sections, while comedians perform skits between blocks of songs. Mor lam sing performances typically consist of medleys of luk thung and lam songs, with electric instruments dominant and bawdy repartee. Sing comes from the English word 'racing' (a reference to the music's origin among Isan's biker fraternity; pai sing means 'to go racing about on motorbikes').

Lam in Laos has remained more conservative, and traditional styles are maintained, but massive exposure to Thai media and culture has led to increasing influence and the adoption of the more modern and popular Isan styles.

Criticism
Thai academic Prayut Wannaudom has argued that modern mor lam is increasingly sexualised and lacking in the moral teachings which it traditionally conveyed, and that commercial pressures encourage rapid production and imitation rather than quality and originality. On the other hand, these adaptations have allowed mor lam not only to survive, but itself spread into the rest of Thailand and internationally, validating Isan and Lao culture and providing role-models for the young.

Professor Charles F. Keyes argues for the value of the ancient forms as geomythology: "The Thai-Lao people of northeastern Thailand have a well-developed tradition of 'legends' (nithān) which has been perpetuated in past through the media of folk opera ... known as mō lam mū ... no small number record[ing] events which happened 'long ago' on the Khorat Plateau... [N]ot historical accounts, they are not totally lacking in historical value. A number ... make reference to places which can be identified as being the sites of the ancient towns.... [T]he literature of the region has yet to be fully inventoried, much less analyzed", and adds in a footnote: "Unfortunately, most of these publications have had little circulation outside of the folk opera troupes for which they were intended." He next comments on five toponyms mentioned in the myth of Phadaeng and Nang Ai, and compares these with those in the "Accounts of Fā Dāēet-Song Yāng".

Forms
There are many forms of mor lam.  There can be no definitive list as they are not mutually exclusive, while some forms are confined to particular localities or have different names in different regions. Typically the categorisation is by region in Laos and by genre in Isan, although both styles are popular in the other region. The traditional forms of Isan are historically important, but are now rarely heard:

 lam phi fa (ລຳຜີຟ້າ, ลำผีฟ้า, IPA: lam pʰiː faː) — a ritual to propitiate spirits in cases of possession. Musically it derived from lam tang yao; however, it was performed not by trained musicians but by those (most commonly old women) who thought themselves to have been cured by the ritual.
 mor lam kon (ໝໍລຳກອນ, หมอลำกลอน, IPA: mɔːlam kɔːn) — a vocal "battle" between the sexes. In Laos it is known as lam tat.  Performances traditionally lasted all night, and consisted of first two, then three parts:
 lam tang san (ລຳ ທາງ ສ້ັນ, ลำทางสั้น, IPA: lam tʰaːŋ san) — ("short form") took up the bulk of the time, with the singers delivering gon poems a few minutes in length, performing alternately for about half an hour each from evening until about an hour before dawn. They would pretend gradually to fall in love, sometimes with rather explicit sexual banter.
 lam tang nyao (ລຳທາງຍາວ, ลำทางยาว, IPA: lam tʰaːŋ ɲaːw) — ("long form"), a representation of the lovers' parting performed slowly and in a speech rhythm for about a quarter of an hour.
 lam toei (ລຳເຕີ້ຍ, ลำเต้ย, IPA: lam tɤːj) —  was introduced in the mid-20th century. Similar in length to the lam tang nyao, it is fast and light-hearted, with metrical texts falling into three categories: toei thammada ("normal toei"), using gon texts in Isan; toei Phama ("Burmese toei"), using central or northern Thai texts and forms; and toei Khong ("Mekong toei"), again central or northern Thai in origin. It uses the same scale as lam yao.
 mor lam mu (ໝໍລຳໝູ່, หมอลำหมู่, IPA: mɔːlam muː) — folk opera, developed in the mid-20th century.  Lam mu is visually similar to central Thai likay, but the subject matter (mainly Jataka stories) derived from lam rueang (the subgenre of ) and the music from lam tang nyao.  It was originally more serious than lam plern and required more skilled performers, but in the late-20th century the two converged to a style strongly influenced by central Thai and Western popular music and dance. Both have now declined in popularity and are now rare.
 mor lam phoen (ໝໍລຳເພີນ, หมอลำเพลิน, IPA: mɔːlam pʰɤn) — a celebratory narrative, performed by a group.  It originated around the same time as lam mu, but used a more populist blend of song and dance.  The material consisted of metrical verses sung in the yao scale, often with a speech-rhythm introduction.
  (ລຳພື້ນ, ลำพื้น, IPA: lam pʰɯn) — recital of local legends or Jataka stories, usually by a male singer, with khene accompaniment. In the sub-genre of lam rueang (ລຳເຣື່ອງ, 	ลำเรื่อง, IPA: lam lɯːaŋ), sometimes performed by women, the singer acts out the various characters in costume.  Performance of one complete story can last for one or two whole nights. This genre is now extremely rare, and may be extinct.

Regional styles

Isan has regional styles, but these are styles of performance rather than separate genres. In the latter half of the 20th century the Ubon style came to dominate; the adaptation of Khon Kaen material to imitate the Ubon style was sometimes called the Chaiyaphum style.

The Lao regional styles are divided into the southern and central styles (lam) and the northern styles (khap). The northern styles are more distinct as the terrain of northern Laos has made communications there particularly difficult, while in southern and central Laos cross-fertilisation has been much easier. Northern Lao singers typically perform only one style, but those in the south can often perform several regional styles as well as some genres imported from Isan.

The main Lao styles are:

 Lam Sithandone (ລຳສີທັນດອນ, ลำสีทันดร) (also called Lam Si Pan Don [ລຳສີພັນດອນ, ลำสีพันดอน]), from Champassak is similar in style to the lam gon of Ubon. It is accompanied by a solo khene, playing in a san mode, while the vocal line shifts between san and yao scales. The rhythm of the vocal line is also indeterminate, beginning in speech rhythm and shifting to a metrical rhythm.
 Lam Som  is rarely performed and may now be extinct. From Champassak, the style is hexatonic, using the yao scale plus a supertonic C, making a scale of  A-B-C-D-E-G. It uses speech rhythm in the vocal line, with a slow solo khene accompaniment in meter. It is similar to Isan's . Both Lam Som and Lam Sithandone lack the descending shape of the vocal line used in the other southern Lao styles.
 Lam Khon Savane (ລຳຄອນສະຫວັນ, ลำคอนสะหวัน, IPA: lam kʰɔːn saʔvan) from Savannakhet is one of the most widespread genres. It uses the san scale, with a descending vocal line over a more rigidly metrical ensemble accompaniment. Lam Ban Xoc (ລຳບ້ານຊອກ, ลำบ้านซอก, IPA: lam baːn sɔːk) and Lam Mahaxay (ລຳມະຫາໄຊ, มหาไซ, IPA: lam maʔhaːsɑj) are musically very similar, but Ban Xoc is usually performed only on ceremonial occasions while Mahaxay is distinguished by a long high note preceding each descent of the vocal line.
 Lam Phu Thai (ລຳຜູ້ໄທ, ลำผู้ไท, IPA: lam pʰuː tɑj) uses the yao scale, with a descending vocal line and ensemble accompaniment in meter.
 Lam Tang Vay (ລຳຕັງຫວາຍ, ลำตังหวาย, IPA: lam a vɑj) is a Lao version of Mon-Khmer music, with a descending ensemble accompaniment.
 Lam Saravane (ລຳສາລະວັນ, ลำสาละวัน [ลำสุวรรณ], IPA: lam saːlaʔvan) is also of Mon-Khmer origin. It uses the yao scale. The descending vocal line is in speech rhythm, while the khene and drum accompaniment is in meter.
 Khap Thum Luang Phrabang  (ຂັບທຸ້ມຫລວງພະບາງ, ขับทุ้มหลวงพระบาง, IPA: kʰap tʰum pʰaʔbaːŋ) is related to the court music of Luang Phrabang, but transformed into a folk-song style. The singer and audience alternately sing lines to a set melody, accompanied by an ensemble.
 Khap Xieng Khouang (ຂັບຊຽງຂວາງ, ขับเซียงขวาง, IPA: kʰap siːaŋ kʰwaːŋ) also called Khap Phuan (ຂັບພວນ, ขับพวน) uses the yao scale and is typically sung metrically by male singers and non-metrically by women.
 Khap Ngeum (ຂັບງຶມ, ขับงึม, IPA: kʰap ŋɯm)   uses the yao scale. It alternates declaimed line from the singer and non-metrical khene passages, at a pace slow enough to allow improvisation.
 Khap Xam Neua (ຂັບຊຳເໜຶອ, ขับซำเหนือ, IPA: kʰap sam nɯːa) uses the yao scale. Singers are accompanied by a solo khene, declaiming lines each ending in a cadence.
 Khap Tai Dam (ຂັບໄທດຳ, ขับไทดำ, IPA: kʰap tʰɑj dam) used for Tai dam people.

Below is a comparative table of regional mor lam styles, sourced from Compton (1979).

Performers
Traditionally, young mor lam were taught by established artists, paying them for their teaching with money or in kind. The education focused on memorising the texts of the verses to be sung; these texts could be passed on orally or in writing, but they always came from a written source. Since only men had access to education, it was only men who wrote the texts. The musical education was solely by imitation. Khaen-players typically had no formal training, learning the basics of playing from friends or relatives and thereafter again relying on imitation.  With the decline of the traditional genres, this system has fallen into disuse; the emphasis on singing ability (or looks) is greater, while the lyrics of a brief modern song present no particular challenge of memorisation.

The social status of mor lam is ambiguous. Even in the Isan heartland, Miller notes a clear division between the attitudes of rural and urban people: the former see mor lam as "teacher, entertainer, moral force, and preserver of tradition", while the latter, "hold mawlum singers in low esteem, calling them country bumpkins, reactionaries, and relegating them to among the lower classes since they make their money by singing and dancing".

Performance
In Laos, lam may be performed standing (lam yuen) or sitting (lam nang).  Northern lam is typically lam yuen and southern lam is typically lam nang.  In Isan lam was traditionally performed seated, with a small audience surrounding the singer, but over the latter half of the 20th century the introduction of stages and amplification allowed a shift to standing performances in front of a larger audience.

Live performances are now often large-scale events, involving several singers, a dance troupe and comedians. The dancers (or hang khreuang) in particular often wear spectacular costumes, while the singers may go through several costume changes in the course of a performance. Additionally, smaller-scale, informal performances are common at festivals, temple fairs and ceremonies such as funerals and weddings. These performances often include improvised material between songs and passages of teasing dialogue (Isan สอย, soi) between the singer and members of the audience.

Characteristics

Music
Lam singing is characterised by the adaptation of the vocal line to fit the tones of the words used.  It also features staccato articulation and rapid shifting between the limited number of notes in the scale being used, commonly delivering around four syllables per second. There are two pentatonic scales, each of which roughly corresponds to intervals of a western diatonic major scale as follows:

The actual pitches used vary according to the particular khene accompanying the singer. The khene itself is played in one of six modes based on the scale being used.

Because Thai and Lao do not include phonemic stress, the rhythm used in their poetry is demarcative, i.e., based on the number of syllables rather than on the number of stresses.  In gon verse (the most common form of traditional lam text) there are seven basic syllables in each line, divided into three and four syllable hemistiches. When combined with the musical beat, this produces a natural rhythm of four on-beat syllables, three off-beat syllables, and a final one beat rest:

In actual practice this pattern is complicated by the subdivision of beats into even or dotted two-syllable pairs and the addition of prefix syllables which occupy the rest at the end of the previous line; each line may therefore include eleven or twelve actual syllables. In the modern form, there are sudden tempo changes from the slow introduction to the faster main section of the song.  Almost every contemporary mor lam song features the following bassline rhythm, which is often ornamented melodically or rhythmically, such as by dividing the crotchets into quavers:

The ching normally play a syncopated rhythm on the off-beat, giving the music a characteristically quick rhythm and tinny sound.

Content
Mor lam is traditionally sung in Lao. The subject matter varied according to the genre: love in the lam gon of Ubon; general knowledge in the lam jot of Khon Kaen; or Jataka stories in lam phun.  The most common verse form was the four-line gon stanza with seven main syllables per line, although in Khon Kaen the technical subject matter led to the use of a free-form series of individual lines, called gon gap.  In Laos, it is the regional styles which determine the form of the text. Each style may use a metrical or a speech-rhythm form, or both; where the lines are metrical, the lam styles typically use seven syllables, as in Isan, while the khap styles use four or five syllables per line.  The slower pace of some Lao styles allows the singer to improvise the verse, but otherwise the text is memorised.

In recent decades, the Ubon style has come to dominate lam in Isan, while the central Thai influence has led to most songs being written in a mix of Isan and Thai. Unrequited love is a prominent theme, although this is laced with a considerable amount of humour. Many songs feature a loyal boy or girl who stays at home in Isan, while his or her partner goes to work as a migrant labourer in Bangkok and finds a new, richer lover.

The gon verses in lam tang san were typically preceded by a slower, speech-rhythm introduction, which included the words o la no ("oh my dear", an exhortation to the listeners to pay attention) and often a summary of the content of the poem.  From this derives the groen (Thai เกริ่น) used in many modern songs: a slow, sung introduction, generally accompanied by the khene, introducing the subject of the song, and often including the o la naw. (sample)   The pleng (Thai เพลง) is a sung verse, often in central Thai. (sample), while the actual lam (Thai ลำ) appears as a  chorus between pleng sections. (sample)

Recordings

As few mor lam artists write all their own material, many of them are extremely prolific, producing several albums each year. Major singers release their recordings on audio tape, CD and VCD formats. The album may take its name from a title track, but others are simply given a series number.

Mor lam VCDs can also often be used for karaoke. A typical VCD song video consists of a performance, a narrative film, or both intercut. The narrative depicts the subject matter of the song; in some cases, the lead role in the film is played by the singer.  In the performance, the singer performs the song in front of a static group of dancers, typically female. There may be a number of these recordings in different costumes, and costumes may be modern or traditional dress; the singer often wears the same costume in different videos on the same album. The performance may be outdoors or in a studio; studio performances are often given a psychedelic animated backdrop. Videos from Laos tend to be much more basic, with lower production values.

Some of the most popular current artists are Banyen Rakgan, Chalermphol Malaikham, Somjit Borthong, Pornsak Songsaeng, Jintara Poonlarp, Siriporn Ampaipong and Vieng Narumon. In 2001, the first album by Dutch singer Christy Gibson was released.

In 2000, British musician Jah Wobble released the album Molam Dub (30 Hertz Records), a fusion of his reggae-influenced bass guitar with guest appearances by Laotian singers and performers. In 2007, singer Jonny Olsen released the first ever mor lam album by a Westerner, or "farang" in Laos.)

Live venues
There are several popular venues where mor lam and luk thung music are performed. These venues usually carry the word "Isan" in their names. such as "Tawan Daeng Isan" and "Isan Isan" in Bangkok.

Mor Lam artists 
 Dao Bandon
 Pornsak Songsaeng
 Sommainoi Duangcharoen
 Siriporn Ampaipong
 Somjit Borthong
 Noknoi Uraiporn
 Sathit Thongjan
 Ki Daophet Niuhuang
 Jintara Poonlarp
 Honey Sri-Isan
 Man Maneewan
 Monkhaen Kaenkoon
 Maithai Huajaisilp
 Dueanphen Amnuaiporn
 Saeng-arun Bunyu
 Banyen Rakgan
 Chalermpol Malakham
 Poyfai Malaiporn
 Christy Gibson
 Tai Orathai
 Phai Phongsathon
 Mike Phiromphon
 Yinglee Srijumpol
 Ble Patumrach R-Siam
 Lamyai Haithongkham
 Moukdavanyh Santiphone
 Vieng Narumon

See also
 Lao music

References

Sources
 Alexander, Geoff. Introduction from The Academic Film Archive of North America. Accessed 13 May 2005.
 Broughton, Simon (ed).  World Music Volume 2.  Rough Guides (2000).
 Chawiwan Damnoen.   Mo Lam Singing of Northeast Thailand (CD). World Music Library (1991).
 Compton, Carol. 1979. Courting poetry in Laos: a textual and linguistic analysis. Northern Illinois Center for Southeast Asian Studies.
 
 Miller, Terry E. Performing Isan-Style Lam in Laos: an Expression of Pan-Laoism or Thai Hegemony Accessed 13 May 2005.
 Miller, Terry E. (1985). Traditional Music of the Lao: Kaen Playing and Mawlam Singing in North-east Thailand. Greenwood Press.  .
 Mosel, James N.  (1959). Sound and Rhythm in Thai and English Verse, Pasa lae Nangsue.
 Prayut Wannaudom The Collision between Local Performing Arts and Global Communication, in case Mawlum.  Accessed 13 May 2005.

External links
 Archive of Lao music
 Laos Cultural Profile (Ministry of Information and Culture/Visiting Arts)
 The Soul of Molam (2)—Inside the molam bus project: The Sound of Isaan's political molam
 The Soul of Molam (3)—The dying capital of Molam: Maha Sarakham's molam agencies face their last days
 The Soul of Molam (4)—Meet Mod the Electric Phin Maker
 The Soul of Molam (6)—Turning the music scene upside down, new Isaan singers find their voice

 
Thai styles of music
Laotian music